The second season of the musical comedy-drama television series Glee originally aired between September 21, 2010 and May 24, 2011 on Fox in the United States. The 22-episode season was produced by 20th Century Fox Television and Ryan Murphy Television, with executive producers Dante Di Loreto and series co-creators Ryan Murphy and Brad Falchuk, with the other series co-creator, Ian Brennan, as co-executive producer.

The series features the New Directions glee club at the fictional William McKinley High School in the town of Lima, Ohio. Season two follows the club competing on the show choir circuit, while its members and faculty deal with sex, religion, homophobia, financial difficulties, rumors, teenage drinking, death and other social issues. The central characters are glee club director Will Schuester (Matthew Morrison), cheerleading coach Sue Sylvester (Jane Lynch), guidance counselor Emma Pillsbury (Jayma Mays), and glee club members Artie Abrams (Kevin McHale), Brittany Pierce (Heather Morris), Finn Hudson (Cory Monteith), Kurt Hummel (Chris Colfer), Mercedes Jones (Amber Riley), Noah "Puck" Puckerman (Mark Salling), Quinn Fabray (Dianna Agron), Rachel Berry (Lea Michele), Santana Lopez (Naya Rivera) and Tina Cohen-Chang (Jenna Ushkowitz). Will's ex-wife Terri (Jessalyn Gilsig) and Kurt's father Burt (Mike O'Malley) round out the list of main characters.

The season received generally positive reviews from critics. The musical performances from the second season expanded on the success of the first season, with the show releasing five soundtrack albums and over one hundred digital singles. The cast decisively broke the record for most charted songs by an act in the 52-year history of the Billboard Hot 100 with 156 appearances through the end of its second season. Two singles, "Teenage Dream" and "Loser like Me", were the first to have over 200,000 downloads in their first week of release in the US, and both charted in the top ten in the US and Canada, and have been certified gold in the US. The season was nominated for twelve Emmy Awards, five Golden Globe Awards, five Satellite Awards and over fifty other awards. Three DVDs have been released with episodes from the season: Glee – Season 2, Volume 1 featuring episodes one through ten, Glee – Season 2, Volume 2 featuring episodes eleven through twenty-two, and Glee – The Complete Second Season.

Episodes

Production
The season was produced by 20th Century Fox Television and Ryan Murphy Television, and aired on Fox in the US. The executive producers were Dante Di Loreto, and series creators Ryan Murphy and Brad Falchuk, with Murphy serving as showrunner and co-creator Ian Brennan acting as co-executive producer. All episodes were written by Murphy, Falchuk and Brennan. Murphy and Falchuk directed three episodes each, while other episodes were directed by Alfonso Gomez-Rejon, Eric Stoltz, Adam Shankman, Bradley Buecker, Carol Banker, Paris Barclay, Tate Donovan and Tim Hunter. Each episode cost $3.2 million–$3.8 million to produce, an increase of 20 percent on the first season, with the exception of the Super Bowl episode, which was estimated to cost as much as $5 million, and the season finale, which required a week filmed on location in New York City, and was the most expensive Glee episode yet, at a reported $6 million.

The season began airing on September 21, 2010, in the 8 pm (ET) timeslot on Tuesdays. A special episode aired after Super Bowl XLV on February 6, 2011. Fox planned to move the show to the 9 pm time slot on Wednesdays following the Super Bowl, but the network later revised its schedule, leaving Glee on Tuesdays in order to concentrate on building up its weaker Wednesday and Thursday line-ups. Episode eighteen, "Born This Way", became Glee first 90-minute episode. Its runtime was extended from the standard 60 minutes to allow the inclusion of more musical numbers. The season concluded on May 24, 2011, with the episode moved to the 9 pm (ET) timeslot following the American Idol finale. The commissioning of a third season was announced on May 23, 2010, before the first season had concluded airing.

Murphy intended the second season to accentuate focus on formerly minor characters, particularly Santana, Brittany and Mike. He commented, "Everyone gets a chance to shine this season. Instead of going bigger and overstuffing Season 2, which people would expect, we’re going under it. We'll pick up on the stories of our main cast, but we’re also going to spend time on the support characters. Everyone gets their moment." Not all of his plans came to fruition; in July 2010, Murphy claimed that glee club co-captains Finn and Rachel would remain in a relationship throughout the season, however this was abandoned in favor of a love-triangle storyline to generate conflict. One unintended development was the emergence of Kurt as a central character—his role grew in prominence as a result of the writers' desire to do justice to the gay bullying storyline.

Reluctant to produce too many tribute episodes, Murphy limited the season to two: the Spears tribute "Britney/Brittany", and "Rumours", the series' first episode to pay tribute to an album, Fleetwood Mac's Rumours. The fifth episode, "The Rocky Horror Glee Show" served as an additional homage to The Rocky Horror Show. Although Murphy had planned to showcase original songs in Glee as early as October 2009, they featured for the first time during the second season, after he found a way to include the concept organically, in the form of a glee club assignment.

Cast

The twelve main cast members from the first season returned for the second: Matthew Morrison as glee club director Will Schuester, Jane Lynch as cheerleading coach Sue Sylvester, Jayma Mays as guidance counselor Emma Pillsbury, Jessalyn Gilsig as Will's former wife Terri Schuester and Dianna Agron, Chris Colfer, Kevin McHale, Lea Michele, Cory Monteith, Amber Riley, Mark Salling and Jenna Ushkowitz as glee club members Quinn Fabray, Kurt Hummel, Artie Abrams, Rachel Berry, Finn Hudson, Mercedes Jones, Noah "Puck" Puckerman and Tina Cohen-Chang, respectively. Heather Morris and Naya Rivera, who portrayed the formerly recurring roles of Brittany Pierce and Santana Lopez, were promoted to series regulars, as was Mike O'Malley as Kurt's father Burt Hummel.

Supporting cast members Harry Shum, Jr. and Ashley Fink had increased roles as New Directions members Mike Chang and Lauren Zizes. Two recurring cast members from season one did not return: Dijon Talton's glee club member Matt Rutherford was written out as having transferred, and Patrick Gallagher's football coach Ken Tanaka was replaced by Dot-Marie Jones as Shannon Beiste. Returning secondary characters included Iqbal Theba as Principal Figgins, Stephen Tobolowsky as former glee club director Sandy Ryerson, Romy Rosemont as Finn's mother Carole Hudson, Max Adler as school bully Dave Karofsky and James Earl as his fellow bully Azimio, Josh Sussman as school reporter Jacob Ben Israel, Lauren Potter as cheerleader Becky Jackson, Jonathan Groff as Rachel's ex-boyfriend Jesse St. James, and Kristin Chenoweth as former glee club star April Rhodes. The season introduced several new recurring characters: Chord Overstreet was cast as transfer student Sam Evans; Darren Criss appeared as Blaine Anderson, lead singer of rival glee club the Dalton Academy Warblers; Cheyenne Jackson played Dustin Goolsby, the coach of rival glee club Vocal Adrenaline; Jake Zyrus appeared as Sunshine Corazon, a foreign exchange student from the Philippines and a rival to Rachel who ultimately joins Vocal Adrenaline; John Stamos played dentist Carl Howell, a love interest for Emma; and Gwyneth Paltrow appeared as substitute teacher Holly Holliday.

Meat Loaf and Barry Bostwick, who both starred in The Rocky Horror Picture Show, appeared in Glee Halloween Rocky Horror tribute episode, playing right-wing television station managers and colleagues of Sue. Adam Kolkin portrayed an eight-year-old Kurt in the third episode of the season, and in the seventh episode, child actors portraying preschool-aged versions of New Directions were featured. Sue's mother Doris Sylvester was also introduced this season, played by Carol Burnett. Journalist Katie Couric made a guest appearance as herself when she interviewed Sue during "The Sue Sylvester Shuffle".

A reality series featuring open auditions for the show was intended to air on Fox in advance of the season, but was cancelled due to Murphy's desire to concentrate on the main series, and fear that the distraction of the reality show might damage Glee. The idea was picked up by Oxygen, and The Glee Project began airing in June 2011, after the end of season. The winner was to receive a multi-episode guest-starring role in Glee third season; in the finale, all four finalists were given prizes: there were two winners of seven-episode arcs, and two runners-up who were given two episodes each.

Music

Glee second season saw a shift toward covering more Top 40 songs than the first, in an effort to appeal more to the 18–49 demographic. Having used 2010 songs such as Bruno Mars' "Just the Way You Are" and Cee Lo Green's "Forget You", music supervisor PJ Bloom commented, "We're using songs on the show the same time they're charting as new hits." He described the process behind selecting songs, clearing rights, recording, and filming numbers as taking as little as a few weeks to complete. Executive music producer Adam Anders revealed that production and planning even occurs before rights for songs are cleared, as Glee creators are offered the opportunity to listen to upcoming songs before their release by publishers and record labels.

The extended play (EP) Glee: The Music, The Rocky Horror Glee Show was released mid-October 2010 to accompany the fifth episode. Glee: The Music, The Christmas Album, featuring winter holiday-themed songs, was released on November 9, 2010, and Glee: The Music, Volume 4, featuring recordings from the first half of the season, was released at the end of that month. An additional EP tied to the Super Bowl episode, when it was initially planned to also be a tribute episode, was dropped when the tribute idea was; Glee: The Music, Volume 5, which featured recordings from that Super Bowl episode through the Regionals competition episode, was released on March 8, 2011. Another soundtrack album, released on April 19, 2011, features the Dalton Academy Warblers: Glee: The Music Presents the Warblers. The final CD accompanying the season, Glee: The Music, Volume 6, was released on May 23, 2011.

Second season musical releases attained some chart success. Glee: The Music, The Rocky Horror Glee Show peaked at number six on the Billboard 200 with 48,000 copies sold. It marked the lowest debut and sales for the cast in the United States, but the highest position ever reached for a Rocky Horror album. Glee: The Music, The Christmas Album and Glee: The Music, Volume 5 both peaked at number one, in Canada and Australia respectively; the highest-charting album in the US was Glee: The Music Presents the Warblers at number two. The Christmas album was certified platinum in the US, and Glee: The Music, Volume 4 has nearly achieved double platinum certification in Australia. The cast's cover of "O Holy Night" debuted at number one on the Holiday Digital Songs chart. The highest-charting single on the Billboard Hot 100 was the cast's original song "Loser like Me" which debuted at number six. The single sold 210,000 downloads in that week, second only to the cast's cover of Katy Perry's "Teenage Dream", which sold a record 55,000 downloads on its first day and a total of 214,000 downloads its first week in the US—it became the first Glee Cast single to top Billboard Digital Songs chart, reached number eight on the Hot 100, and it beat the previous first-week sales record of 177,000 held by debut single "Don't Stop Believin', which had hit number four on the Hot 100. "Teenage Dream" and "Loser Like Me" were the second and third cast singles to be certified Gold in the US; the first was "Don't Stop Believin, which subsequently received its Platinum certification during the second season.

The record for most appearances by a group on the Billboard Hot 100, previously set by The Beatles, was broken when six songs from the season's second episode, "Britney/Brittany", debuted on the chart the week of October 16, 2010, which put the Glee total at seventy-five. This feat also placed the cast third overall among all artists, behind James Brown and Elvis Presley. Four songs debuted on November 18, 2010, which pushed the number of appearances to ninety-three and surpassed Brown for second place. On February 16, 2011, it was announced that Glee had increased its Hot 100 appearances to 113 songs and moved past Elvis to hold the record for the most Hot 100 entries. Glee ended the second season with a total of 156 Hot 100 songs. The season's cover versions had a positive effect on some of the original recording artists. Following the broadcast of "Britney/Brittany", sales of the Spears songs covered increased by 35,000 units. The episode "Rumours" had an even greater effect on the Fleetwood Mac album of the same name it featured: in Australia, five days after the episode aired, the Rumours album entered the Australian charts at number two, and was at number three the following week; it received its thirteen-times Platinum certification in Australia at the end of that month.

Reception

Critical response

The review aggregator website Rotten Tomatoes gives the season a 79% with an average rating of 7.61/10, based on 29 reviews. The site's critics consensus reads, "Glee loses some of its spark in this reprise, but the series still delights with its frothy musical numbers and sensitive engagement with pressing social issues." The season received a Metacritic score of 76 out of 100 based on 11 reviews, indicating "generally favorable reviews".

Robert Canning of IGN wrote that the "New York" season finale "was a decent close to an enjoyable season", while The Atlantic Meghan Brown called it "an uneven end to an uneven season", and her colleague Kevin Fallon said that season two was "undeniably frustrating" but "there was still ample reason to tune in and enjoy". Anthony Benigno of The Faster Times gave the season a "C+", but noted that he was "an easy grader". The A.V. Club Emily VanDerWerff gave the season a slightly better "B−", and stated: "The season opened and closed strong, but the middle section was mushy and filled with plenty of episodes that just didn't work." Brett Berk of Vanity Fair summed up as follows: "The quality of Glee second season has been something like the topography of Utah, or the acting career of Amanda Peet—blandly passable and relying on its good looks, but stumbling occasionally upon unfathomable idiosyncrasy, whose presence is at once baffling, frightening, and a bit melancholy—in a good way."

Several episodes drew complaints from advocacy groups. The Parents Television Council named "Britney/Brittany", "Blame It on the Alcohol" and "Sexy" the worst shows of their respective weeks of broadcast, due to their overt sexual content. "Sexy" was also criticized by the children's charity Kidscape for the "wholly inappropriate" inclusion of a song by convicted sex offender Gary Glitter. The Gay & Lesbian Alliance Against Defamation objected to the use of the pejorative term "tranny" in "The Rocky Horror Glee Show", and "The Substitute" was ill-received by the National Alliance on Mental Illness for its humorous depiction of bipolar disorder. Still, some critics praised the show for its even greater diversity in Season 2; Akash Nikolas at Zap2It wrote, "Yes this show is often erratically written, but what it does best is create a queer fantasia to celebrate 'otherness', with much mirth and little victim-hood. No other show on TV features a cast this diverse: people of color, sexual others, different body types, gender subversion and even the disabled."

Ratings
The season premiere episode, "Audition", aired on September 21, 2010; it averaged 12.45 million American viewers and achieved a 5.6/16 Nielsen rating/share in the 18–49 demographic. The second episode, which featured the music of Britney Spears, was also Glee second best showing at that point after its April 2010 return after a four-month hiatus, with 13.51 million viewers and a 5.9/17 rating/share in the 18–49 demographic. All but one of the next fourteen episodes ranged in viewership between 10.51 million and 11.92 million. The exception aired on Sunday, February 6, 2011, after the Super Bowl: Glee received its highest-ever ratings. Over 26.8 million viewers watched it, with an initial peak of 39.5 million, and an overall 18–49 rating/share of 11.1/29.

When the show returned with its final six episodes on April 19, 2011, after a five-week absence, US viewership dipped below ten million, and on the special ninety-minute episode "Born This Way" reached a season low of 8.62 million, with a rating/share of 3.4/11 in the 18–49 demographic. Only for the season finale, when the show aired an hour later than usual to allow the penultimate night of American Idol to air in Glee usual slot, did the number of watchers exceed ten million, when the lead-in helped boost viewership to 11.80 million and the 18–49 rating/share to 4.6/11.

For the season as a whole, Glee was number 43 of 268 primetime shows that averaged at least a million viewers, with an average viewership of 10.11 million, while it tied for number 13 of 249 of shows that received at least a 0.5 rating in the 18–49 rating demographic, with a 4.1 rating average.

A mid-season feature story in The Hollywood Reporter, which ran on January 25, 2011, stated that Glee had become the most-watched program of US origin in the UK.

Accolades

During its second season, Glee was nominated for forty-five awards. It won in three categories at the 68th Golden Globe Awards, from five nominations, and in two categories at the 37th People's Choice Awards, from four nominations. Its five nominations at the Satellite Awards 2010 and three at the 17th Screen Actors Guild Awards produced no wins, nor did two nominations at the NAACP Image Awards. Glee garnered nine nominations at the AfterEllen.com and AfterElton.com Visibility Awards, of which it won four. It was awarded a further four awards by the Gay and Lesbian Entertainment Critics Association at the 2011 Dorian Awards, with the TV Comedy Performance of the Year accolade resulting in a tie between Colfer and Lynch. Series producer Alexis Martin Woodall won the Television Produced By A Woman	accolade at the WIN Awards, where Glee was nominated for three awards in total.

Glee was named one of the American Film Institute Television Programs of the Year at the 2010 AFI Awards, and tied with Modern Family for the Outstanding Comedy Series accolade at the 22nd GLAAD Media Awards. Series costume designer Lou Eyrich received the Outstanding Contemporary Television Series award at the Costume Designers Guild Awards 2010, and casting directors Robert J. Ulrich, Eric Dawson and Carol Kritzer won the CSA Media Access Award and for casting performers with disabilities. The series was additionally nominated in the International TV Show category at the British Academy Television Awards 2010, for International Breakthrough Act at the 2011 BRIT Awards, and in the Digital Choice category at the 2011 National Television Awards. Lynch was nominated for Comedy Actress – TV at the inaugural Comedy Awards. Brennan, Falchuk and Murphy received a Comedy Series nomination at the 2011 Writers Guild of America Awards, and they, along with Di Loreto and Kenneth Silverstein, were nominated for The Danny Thomas Award for Outstanding Producer of Episodic Television – Comedy at the Producers Guild of America Awards 2010.

Home video releases
Glee: Season 2, Volume 1 contains the first ten episodes of the season. It was released as a three-disc box set on Region 1 DVD in the US and Canada on January 25, 2011, on Region 4 DVD in Australia and New Zealand on March 23, 2011, and on Region 2 DVD in the UK and Ireland on April 4, 2011. The special features include a DVD-exclusive song from "The Rocky Horror Glee Show". The final twelve episodes of the season are collected on Glee: Season 2, Volume 2, which was released in the US on September 13, 2011, and includes several special features such as "Building Glee Auditorium" with Cory Monteith and "Shooting Glee in New York City"; Glee: The Complete Second Season was released on the same day in DVD and Blu-ray, and contains all the special features from the second season's first and second DVD volumes. The two DVDs and full-season Blu-ray were released in the UK on September 19, 2011, and in Australia on October 5, 2011. Amazon.com began taking pre-orders for the complete season box set on Blu-ray and DVD in September 2010, the week the season premiered.

References

 2
2010 American television seasons
2011 American television seasons